The Royal College of Pathologists of Australasia, more commonly known by its acronym RCPA is a medical organization that promotes the science and practice of pathology. The RCPA is a leading organisation representing pathologists and other senior scientists in Australasia.

History

The College of Pathologists of Australia was incorporated on 10 April 1956.  In 1970, the college was granted Royal assent, and became the Royal College of Pathologists of Australia.  With the increasing number of Fellows in New Zealand, the college changed its name to the Royal College of Pathologists of Australasia in January 1980. Since 1986, the college has occupied Durham Hall, a heritage listed building in Sydney's Surry Hills and the adjacent 203-205 Albion Street, Surry Hills cottages.

Programmes

Training and examinations
The college conducts training and examinations in several sub-disciplines, including:
 Anatomical Pathology
 Chemical Pathology
 Forensic Pathology
 General Pathology
 Genetics
 Haematology
 Immunopathology
 Microbiology

The college accredits laboratories for training, approves supervised training in accredited laboratories, and conducts examinations leading to Fellowship of the college (FRCPA).

Continuing Professional Development
Since its inception, the college has contributed to the continual development of knowledge and skills of it Fellows, and has established a formal Continuing Professional Development Program.

Professional Practice Standards
The college collaborated with the Commonwealth Government to establish the National Pathology Accreditation Advisory Council (NPAAC) in 1979. NPAAC advises the Commonwealth, State and Territory Health Ministers on matters relating to the accreditation of pathology laboratories, plays a key role in ensuring the quality of Australian pathology services and is responsible for the development and maintenance of standards and guidelines for pathology practices.

While NPAAC provides the standards for laboratory practice, the actual accreditation process is carried out by NATA/RCPA, a joint initiative between the college and the National Association of Testing Authorities (NATA).

References

External links
 

1956 establishments in Australia
Medical associations based in Australia
Specialist medical colleges in Australia
Medical associations based in New Zealand
Medical education in Australia
College of Pathologists of Australasia, Royal
College of Pathologists of Australasia, Royal
Pathology organizations
Pathologists of Australasia